Yeap Ghim Guan (1941 – 12 March 2007) is a Malaysian British-trained lawyer and politician. His political career began in Penang in the 1960s; Yeap served as state assemblyman for Kelawei for one term from 1969 to 1974. He was one of the founder members of the Democratic Action Party (DAP), and served as the party's chairman from 1965 to 1977. However, he left DAP after a bitter power struggle with the then secretary general Lim Kit Siang and co-founded two minor political parties, the Social Democratic Party (SDP) in 1978 and the Malaysian Democratic Party (MDP) in 1999.

Yeap was well known for his aggressiveness, uncompromising stance and remarkable oratory skill. He once presented a 10-hour speech at the Penang Legislative Assembly in the 1970s. Another famous stunt was pledging to dive off the Penang Bridge if the then Chief Minister of Penang, Tun Lim Chong Eu, could successfully build Penang Bridge. He failed to fulfill this pledge when the bridge was completed. However, his aggressive style ultimately proved to be his downfall; in 1974 he tore a poster of the then Prime Minister Tun Abdul Razak Hussein shaking hands with Mao Zedong after the former's ground-breaking trip to the People's Republic of China. Yeap's move was deemed disrespectful, particularly among older Malaysian Chinese. After the incident, the quarrel with Lim Kit Siang and subsequent exit from the DAP, Yeap's political prominence gradually faded. His other attempts to launch new parties were never as successful as the DAP.

He died on 12 March 2007 after two years of long illness due to stroke.

References 
 Tan, J., "Passing of a fiery politician", The Star, 14 March 2007
 

1941 births
2007 deaths
Malaysian people of Chinese descent
20th-century Malaysian lawyers
Democratic Action Party (Malaysia) politicians
Members of the Penang State Legislative Assembly